The 2015 L'Open Emeraude Solaire de Saint-Malo was a professional tennis tournament played on outdoor clay courts. It was the twentieth edition of the tournament and part of the 2015 ITF Women's Circuit, offering a total of $50,000+H in prize money. It took place in Saint-Malo, France, on 14–20 September 2015.

Singles main draw entrants

Seeds 

 1 Rankings as of 31 August 2015

Other entrants 
The following players received wildcards into the singles main draw:
  Emmanuelle de Beer
  Théo Gravouil
  Laëtitia Sarrazin
  Jade Suvrijn

The following players received entry from the qualifying draw:
  Irina Khromacheva
  Tamara Korpatsch
  Olga Sáez Larra
  Natalia Vikhlyantseva

The following player received entry by a lucky loser spot:
  Georgina García Pérez

The following player received entry by a protected ranking:
  Aravane Rezaï

The following player received entry by a junior exempt:
  Daria Kasatkina

Champions

Singles

 Daria Kasatkina def.  Laura Siegemund, 7–5, 7–6(7–4)

Doubles

 Kristína Kučová /  Anastasija Sevastova def.  Maria Marfutina /  Natalia Vikhlyantseva, 6–7(1–7), 6–3, [10–5]

External links 
 2015 L'Open Emeraude Solaire de Saint-Malo at ITFtennis.com
 Official website 

2015 ITF Women's Circuit
2015
2015 in French tennis
L'Open 35 de Saint-Malo